Murid Airbase is a Pakistan Air Force Base located at Murid, Punjab, Pakistan.

External links
Pakistan Aviation
Chart at Pakistan Aviation
Pakistani Nuclear Forces at Global Security
Global Security

Pakistan Air Force bases
Military installations in Punjab, Pakistan